Guillaume Boussès (born October 12, 1981) is a French rugby union player who currently plays for Racing Metro 92 after signing from Stade Français. He earned his first and last cap for the France national team on 5 February 2006 against Scotland.

Notes

1981 births
Biarritz Olympique players
French rugby union players
France international rugby union players
Living people
Rugby union centres